Roscoe is a ghost town in Hill City Township, Graham County, Kansas, United States.

History
Roscoe was issued a post office in 1879. The post office was discontinued in 1893.

References

Further reading

External links
 Graham County maps: Current, Historic, KDOT

Former populated places in Graham County, Kansas
Former populated places in Kansas